†Partula atilis was a species of air-breathing tropical land snail, a terrestrial pulmonate gastropod mollusk in the family Partulidae.
This species was endemic to Raiatea, French Polynesia. It is now extinct.

Description
The small snail lived on the ground, unlike most Partula species.

References 

Partula (gastropod)
Extinct gastropods
Taxonomy articles created by Polbot
Gastropods described in 1956